This is a list of Saint Helena Twenty20 International cricketers.

In April 2018, the ICC decided to grant full Twenty20 International (T20I) status to all its members. Therefore, all Twenty20 matches played between Saint Helena and other ICC members after 1 January 2019 will be eligible to have T20I status.

This list will comprise all members of the Saint Helena cricket team who have played at least one T20I match. It is initially arranged in the order in which each player won his first Twenty20 cap. Where more than one player will win his first Twenty20 cap in the same match, those players will be listed alphabetically by surname (according to the name format used by Cricinfo).

Saint Helena played their first match with T20I status on 17 November 2022 against Kenya during the 2022–23 ICC Men's T20 World Cup Africa Qualifier.

Key

List of Players
Statistics are correct as of 25 November 2022.

References 

Saint Helena